"Rock Show" is a song written and recorded by Peaches. The song was released as a promotional and limited single from her full-length studio album, The Teaches of Peaches in 2003.

Music video
There are two versions of the music video for "Rock Show", both of which were online in an e-card special of The Teaches of Peaches from Kitty-Yo.

Cover versions
Electric Six covered the song with their version included as the B-side for Peaches' single-release. Peaches returned the favour by including a cover of the band's song Gay Bar as a bonus track on Fatherfucker.

The song was covered by Eels during their 2006 "Live and in Person! No Strings Attached" tour, with a London performance released on Live and in Person! London 2006.

Song usage
"Rock Show" has been used in the VH1 television special Totally Gay! and the documentary Filthy Gorgeous: The Trannyshack Story.

Track listing
"Rock Show" by Peaches
"Rock Show" by Electric Six

References

2000 songs
2003 singles
Eels (band) songs
Electric Six songs
Peaches (musician) songs
Song recordings produced by Peaches (musician)
Songs written by Peaches (musician)